Danish Atlas Khan (born 2 January 1994, in Peshawar) is a professional squash player from Pakistan.

Family
Danish Atlas Khan belongs from squash champion's family son of former world team squash champion Mr Atlas Khan & nephew of former world squash champion Mr Jansher Khan.  His father, Atlas Khan, is his coach.

Career
Khan turned pro in 2008. He has represented Pakistan at the British Juniors in U-17s age group in 2009 where he won silver. Danish Atlas Khan has won 32 Gold Medals for Pakistan, he has won silver medal in World junior team championship in Ecuador in 2010 as a team captain and bronze medal in World Junior Championship Individual and became World Rank no 3 in Junior, he was no 1 in Asia and he also won the Asian junior championship twice in 2011 in Jordan and 2012 in Kish, Iran

2010
Danish played at the 2010 Commonwealth Games in New Delhi, India. In his first round he won against Jamaican, Bruce Barrows. He was then defeated in the next round by Englishman, Daryl Selby, 11–5, 11–4, 11–3.

At the 2010 Asian Games in Guangzhou, China, Danish Atlas Khan is the youngest Asian games gold medalist in history at age of 16.
Danish Atlas Khan won 2 x Asian junior championship in 2011-12
Danish Atlas Khan is current Chicago Open Champion 2015

Rankings
Pakistan Highest Rank #1 Senior

Pakistan Highest Rank #1 in Junior

Asian Highest Rank #1 in Junior

World Highest Rank #3 in Junior

(PSA) Professional Squash Association
Highest Rank #65.  (May 2015):

References

http://www.usprosquashseries.com/danish-atlas-khan-captures-chicago-open-crown/

Living people
1994 births
Pakistani male squash players
Squash players at the 2010 Commonwealth Games
Asian Games medalists in squash
Asian Games gold medalists for Pakistan
Squash players at the 2010 Asian Games
Squash players at the 2014 Asian Games
Medalists at the 2010 Asian Games
Racket sportspeople from Peshawar
Pashtun people
Commonwealth Games competitors for Pakistan